The Klein Memorial Auditorium is a 1400-seat proscenium theater located at 910 Fairfield Avenue in Bridgeport, CT. The venue was built with funds willed to the city by Bridgeport native Jacob Klein (1862 - 1932), a lawyer and active supporter of Bridgeport community organizations. The auditorium, designed by local architect Leonard Asheim, was built in the Art Deco style and features bronze doors, a marble lobby, inlaid wood and geometric motifs.

After opening its doors in 1940, the Klein hosted such acts as Leonard Bernstein, Arthur Fiedler, Eleanor Roosevelt, Martin Luther King Jr., Paul Robeson, Milton Berle, Victor Borge and Bill Cosby.  More recently The Klein has hosted such diverse musical acts as Alice Cooper, B.B. King, Buddy Guy, Boz Scaggs, Herbie Hancock, Ziggy Marley, George Carlin, Peter Frampton, Boyz II Men, the B-52s, and the Parris Island Marine Band.

In addition to its history as a concert venue, local dance recitals, graduations, and union meetings occur regularly at the Klein, and the theater has been the home of the Greater Bridgeport Symphony Orchestra for the past 60 years.  Other companies currently in residence include the New England Ballet Company, Greater Bridgeport Youth Orchestras, ConnectUs, and the Fairfield County Children's Choir.

List of notable performers and speakers
 Pat Benatar
 Leonard Bernstein
 George Carlin
 Bill Cosby
 Jimmy Hoffa
 BB King
 Martin Luther King Jr.
 Bob Newhart
 Alice Cooper
 Duke Ellington
 Jose Iturbi
 David Bar-Illan
 Wynton Marsalis and Jazz at Lincoln Center Orchestra
Donald Trump

References

 https://web.archive.org/web/20111124142354/http://www.theklein.org/about/index.html
 https://web.archive.org/web/20120425022149/http://www.hwhct.org/newsletters/HwH%20Newsletter%20Summer%202009.pdf
 http://www.americantowns.com/ct/bridgeport/organization/the_klein_memorial_auditorium/articles
 https://news.google.com/newspapers?id=_sZIAAAAIBAJ&sjid=hAENAAAAIBAJ&pg=987,1467115&dq=klein+auditorium+bridgeport&hl=en

Buildings and structures in Bridgeport, Connecticut
Music venues in Connecticut
Theatres in Connecticut
Tourist attractions in Bridgeport, Connecticut
Theatres completed in 1940
1940 establishments in Connecticut